In five-dimensional geometry, a 5-simplex is a self-dual regular 5-polytope. It has six vertices, 15 edges, 20 triangle faces, 15 tetrahedral cells, and 6 5-cell facets. It has a dihedral angle of cos−1(), or approximately 78.46°.

The 5-simplex is a solution to the problem: Make 20 equilateral triangles using 15 matchsticks, where each side of every triangle is exactly one matchstick.

Alternate names 

It can also be called a hexateron, or hexa-5-tope, as a 6-facetted polytope in 5-dimensions. The name hexateron is derived from hexa- for having six facets and teron (with ter- being a corruption of tetra-) for having four-dimensional facets.

By Jonathan Bowers, a hexateron is given the acronym hix.

As a configuration
This configuration matrix represents the 5-simplex. The rows and columns correspond to vertices, edges, faces, cells and 4-faces. The diagonal numbers say how many of each element occur in the whole 5-simplex. The nondiagonal numbers say how many of the column's element occur in or at the row's element. This self-dual simplex's matrix is identical to its 180 degree rotation.

Regular hexateron cartesian coordinates 
The hexateron can be constructed from a 5-cell by adding a 6th vertex such that it is equidistant from all the other vertices of the 5-cell.

The  Cartesian coordinates for the vertices of an origin-centered regular hexateron having edge length 2 are:

The vertices of the 5-simplex can be more simply positioned on a hyperplane in 6-space as permutations of (0,0,0,0,0,1) or (0,1,1,1,1,1).  These construction can be seen as facets of the 6-orthoplex or rectified 6-cube respectively.

Projected images

Lower symmetry forms 

A lower symmetry form is a 5-cell pyramid ( )v{3,3,3}, with [3,3,3] symmetry order 120, constructed as a 5-cell base in a 4-space hyperplane, and an apex point above the hyperplane. The five sides of the pyramid are made of 5-cell cells. These are seen as vertex figures of truncated regular 6-polytopes, like a truncated 6-cube.

Another form is { }∨{3,3}, with [2,3,3] symmetry order 48, the joining of an orthogonal digon and a tetrahedron, orthogonally offset, with all pairs of vertices connected between. Another form is {3}∨{3}, with [3,2,3] symmetry order 36, and extended symmetry [[3,2,3]], order 72. It represents joining of 2 orthogonal triangles, orthogonally offset, with all pairs of vertices connected between.

The form { }∨{ }∨{ } has symmetry [3[2,2,2]], order 48.

These are seen in the vertex figures of bitruncated and tritruncated regular 6-polytopes, like a bitruncated 6-cube and a tritruncated 6-simplex. The edge labels here represent the types of face along that direction, and thus represent different edge lengths.

The vertex figure of the omnitruncated 5-simplex honeycomb, is a 5-simplx with a petrie polygon cycle of 5 long edges.

Compound
The compound of two 5-simplexes in dual configurations can be seen in this A6 Coxeter plane projection, with a red and blue 5-simplex vertices and edges. This compound has [[3,3,3,3]] symmetry, order 1440. The intersection of these two 5-simplexes is a uniform birectified 5-simplex.  =  ∩ .

Related uniform 5-polytopes 

It is first in a dimensional series of uniform polytopes and honeycombs, expressed by Coxeter as 13k series. A degenerate 4-dimensional case exists as 3-sphere tiling, a tetrahedral hosohedron.

It is first in a dimensional series of uniform polytopes and honeycombs, expressed by Coxeter as 3k1 series. A degenerate 4-dimensional case exists as 3-sphere tiling, a tetrahedral dihedron.

The 5-simplex, as 220 polytope is first in dimensional series 22k.

The regular 5-simplex is one of 19 uniform polytera based on the [3,3,3,3] Coxeter group, all shown here in A5 Coxeter plane orthographic projections. (Vertices are colored by projection overlap order, red, orange, yellow, green, cyan, blue, purple having progressively more vertices)

See also
 11-cell

Notes

References 
 
 Coxeter, H.S.M.: 
 
 
 (Paper 22) 
 (Paper 23) 
 (Paper 24)

External links 

 Polytopes of Various Dimensions, Jonathan Bowers
 Multi-dimensional Glossary

5-polytopes